Kuhsarak-e Olya (also Romanized as Kūhsarak-e ‘Olyā) is a village in Kuh Mareh Khami Rural District, in the Central District of Basht County, Kohgiluyeh and Boyer-Ahmad Province, Iran. As of the 2006 census, its population was 75, in 19 families.

References 

Populated places in Basht County